Hippopsis pubiventris is a species of beetle in the family Cerambycidae. It was described by Galileo and Martins in 1988.

References

Hippopsis
Beetles described in 1988